Dlya millionov (meaning 'For Millions') is the eighth studio album by the Russian ska punk band, Leningrad.

Track listing
"Меня зовут Шнур" - Menya zovut Shnur - (My name is Shnur) – 2:42
"Май" - May – 2:33
"Хуйня" - Khuynya - (Bullshit) 2:54
"Менеджер" - Menedzher - (Manager) – 2:57
"Разпиздяй" - Razpizdyay - (Fuck-up) 3:02
"Оле-Оле" - Ole-Ole 3:11
"К тебе бегу" - K tebe begu - (Running to you) – 3:07
"Зина" - Zina (a Russian girl's name) - 4:27
"Хуямба" - Khuyamba - (Offensive variant of "Mamba", meaning "dick-mamba") – 2:10
"Ноу ноу фьюче" - Nou Nou Fyuche - (Transliteration of "No No Future") – 2:42
"Папа был прав" - Papa byl prav - (Daddy was right) – 2:59
"Бабу буду" - Babu budu - (I'll Do the Chick) – 3:28
"Разпиздяй" - Razpizdyay (radio version) - (Fuck-up) – 2:45
"Дороги" - Dorogi - (Roads)– 2:48
"Ленинград" - Leningrad (Bonus track)" – 2:31

2003 albums
Leningrad (band) albums